Austronesian may refer to:
The Austronesian languages
The historical Austronesian peoples who carried Austronesian languages on their migrations